Horse Hare is a 1960 Warner Bros. Looney Tunes cartoon directed by Friz Freleng. The short was released on February 13, 1960, and stars Bugs Bunny and Yosemite Sam. It was the first Bugs Bunny cartoon released in the 1960s.

Plot
In 1886, Sergeant Bugs Bunny of the United States Cavalry is ordered to guard Fort Lariat as the cavalry goes on a special mission. Bugs patrols the fort, but an Indian army led by Renegade Sam (Yosemite Sam) wants to take it over. Sam orders an attack on the fort and they fire arrows at it. Sam tries to stop the men from approaching, but they don't and he is crushed against the door. Sam calls for Bugs to surrender but Bugs shoots Sam's hat off. Bugs uses tally-marks to keep track of how many Indians he has beaten, singing "Ten Little Indians."

As an Indian tries to fire arrows at the fort, Bugs replaces an arrow with a stick of triggered dynamite causing Sam to decide to kill Bugs himself. Sam tries to fire his pistol but it remains stuck, yet fires a bullet whenever Bugs is holding it toward Sam or when he is firing away from Bugs. Sam orders his toughest, biggest but dim-witted thug, Geronimo, to break into the Fort's gate. Geronimo tries to use a giant tree tube as a battering ram but ends up squashing Sam. Sam tries to arrow himself into the Fort. When he flies down towards the fort, he tries to shoot Bugs, who simply puts a wooden board in front of Sam so that he  ends up sliding out of the fort.

When the chief misses his shots, Sam decides to shoot at the fort himself. When he fires his shot, Bugs, hiding behind rocks, fires a bullet by slingshot into the chief's head and the chief scolds Sam. When Sam fires, Bugs does the same thing and the chief tells Sam "Look, ugly, "plunk-em" me once more, and it's your last "plunk-em"!" Suspicious that someone else is firing at them, Sam fakes a shot, looks behind him and sees Bugs launch another bullet into the chief's head. When Sam points Bugs out, this provokes the chief into punching Sam, believing Sam shot him on purpose.

Later at an Indian party Sam sees Bugs spying on them. He orders an attack but the cavalry comes to the rescue. While Bugs hides underground, Sam and his horse are unable to call off the attacks and end up in the middle between the two forces. Bugs looks up from his hole and sees nothing but feathers.

Sam and his mule, both of whom have been trampled from the battle, confront Bugs as Sam says "I hate you!" (with the same "cramped" voice that he used in Knighty Knight Bugs) while his mule tells him "And I hate you!". Bugs remarks "And ME? I love everybody!"

Controversy
This cartoon was one of the 12 pulled from Cartoon Network's 2001 "June Bugs" marathon due to its negative caricatures of Native Americans.

See also
 List of Bugs Bunny cartoons
 List of Yosemite Sam cartoons

References

External links 
 

1960 films
1960 animated films
1960 short films
1960s Western (genre) comedy films
Films set in 1886
Looney Tunes shorts
Warner Bros. Cartoons animated short films
American Western (genre) comedy films
Films scored by Milt Franklyn
Western (genre) animated films
Bugs Bunny films
1960 comedy films
1960s Warner Bros. animated short films
Films with screenplays by Michael Maltese
Short films directed by Friz Freleng
Yosemite Sam films
1960s English-language films
Films about the United States Army
Films about Native Americans
Native American-related controversies
Race-related controversies in animation
Race-related controversies in film